Rail transport in Staffordshire has a long history. Stafford itself is a major "crossroads" on the West Coast Main Line, handling passenger and freight services between London and Scotland along with traffic travelling between Manchester and Birmingham. Stoke-on-Trent was once a major railway centre, especially for traffic associated with the coal mining and pottery industries, but in recent years this traffic has almost completely disappeared.

History 

 Grand Junction Railway (1833–1846)
 London and North Western Railway (1846–1922)
 North Staffordshire Railway (1845–1922) 220.75 miles (355 km)
 Leek and Manifold Valley Light Railway (narrow gauge) (1904–1922) 8.25 miles (13 km)
 London, Midland and Scottish Railway (1923–1948)
 British Rail (1947–1997)
 London Midland Region (British Railways) (1948–?)
 Western Region of British Railways (1948–1963)
 Regional Railways (1981–1996)
 InterCity (British Rail) (1981–1997)
 Central Trains (1997–2007)
 First North Western (1997–2004)
 Virgin CrossCountry (1997–2007)
 Virgin Trains West Coast (1997-2019)
 Northern Rail (2004–2016)
 CrossCountry (2007 to date)
 East Midlands Trains (2007–2019)
 London Midland (2007–2017)
 Arriva Rail North (2016-2020)
 West Midlands Trains (2017 to date)
 East Midlands Railway (2019 to date)
 Avanti West Coast (2019 to date)
 Northern Trains (2020 to date)

The decline of the railways

Staffordshire's railways were considerably reduced by the Beeching cuts in the 1960s. The famous Loop Line along with several other routes were closed, while several  stations, such as Uttoxeter, only narrowly missed closure. A considerable number of coal mines retained their railway connections, but with the decline of the industry, very few survive.

Barlaston, Norton Bridge and Wedgwood last saw rail services in 2003. Etruria, no longer used by local workers, closed in 2005.

Stone station reopening
Stone railway station was reopened in 2008.

Current lines
Cross-City Line
West Coast Main Line
Cross Country Route (Derby to Birmingham)
Chase Line
Crewe to Derby Line

Closed lines
Cheadle Branch Line
Potteries Loop Line
South Staffordshire Line
Stafford and Uttoxeter Railway
Stoke-Market Drayton Line

Heritage railways
Chasewater Railway
Churnet Valley Railway
Foxfield Railway
Rudyard Lake Steam Railway

References

External links
Historic photographs of railways in North Staffordshire